Hope Valley is a suburb of Perth, Western Australia, located within the City of Kwinana. Its post code is 6165. According to the 2021 census, the population of Hope Valley is 39. Between 1882 and 1886, European settlement began in the area when a community consisting of small mixed farms, named Hope Valley after the property of its first settler George Postans, was established. Hope Valley was officially gazetted as a locality in 1962.

References

External links

Suburbs of Perth, Western Australia
Suburbs in the City of Kwinana